Jesús Martínez may refer to:

Jesús Martínez (footballer) (born 1952), Mexican football (soccer) player
Jesús Martínez (boxer) (born 1976), Mexican boxer
Jesus Martinez (fighter) (born 1983), American mixed martial artist
Jesús Martínez (artist), Mexican contemporary artist and member of the Salón de la Plástica Mexicana
Jesús Martinez (cyclist), Mexican cyclist
Jesús Martinez (attorney), American immigration and personal injury attorney